"Safe with Me" is a song by American DJ and producer Gryffin and American singer-songwriter Audrey Mika. It was released on November 19, 2020, via Darkroom and Interscope Records. The song was written by Gryffin, Andrew Jackson, Chris Loco, Cleo Tighe and Mika.

Background
In an interview with Paper, Gryffin said: "As the song was being worked on, I got put onto Audrey's music from one of my managers, and was immediately drawn to her voice and sound. We pitched the idea of the record to her and she connected with it right away. We got into the studio in LA, and began to fully develop the sound and vibe of the record. We're so happy with how it turned out."

Content
The track conveys messages of "love, safety and stability". Logan Potter of Euphoriazine felt that its lyrics conveys a message of "openness and comfort, admitting to putting up walls as a means of self-protection with words like." The song is written in the key of B major, with a tempo of 100 beats per minute.

Track listing

Charts

Weekly charts

Year-end charts

References

2020 singles
2020 songs
Gryffin songs
Songs written by Gryffin
Songs written by Chris Loco
Interscope Records singles